Thomas Allen Catlin (September 8, 1931 – June 7, 2008) was an American football player and coach. He spent a total of 37 years in the National Football League, including stints as defensive coordinator with the Buffalo Bills (1978–1982) and Seattle Seahawks (1983–1992). Earlier, he had been a pilot in the United States Air Force. He was born in Ponca City, Oklahoma and died in Seattle, Washington.

References

1931 births
2008 deaths
People from Ponca City, Oklahoma
Players of American football from Oklahoma
American football centers
American football linebackers
Oklahoma Sooners football players
Cleveland Browns players
Philadelphia Eagles players
Coaches of American football from Oklahoma
Dallas Texans (AFL) coaches
Kansas City Chiefs coaches
Los Angeles Rams coaches
National Football League defensive coordinators
Buffalo Bills coaches
Seattle Seahawks coaches